Jordyn Sheerin (born 18 August 1989) is a Scottish professional footballer and current assistant manager of Lowland League team Gala Fairydean Rovers.

Career

East Fife and loans
Sheerin started his career with East Fife, where he stayed until 2010. Unable to fully break into the first team, he was loaned out to Arniston Rangers and Camelon Juniors where he went on to win the East of Scotland Cup. After leaving East Fife, Sheerin signed for Arbroath on a free transfer.

Arbroath, East Stirlingshire and Junior
Sheerin moved to Arbroath looking to score his first goal for a Scottish professional team. He stayed at Arbroath for one season and was part of the side which won the Scottish Third Division. He subsequently moved to Third Division club East Stirlingshire, where he scored his first professional goal, which would be his only goal for the Shire. He then signed on a permanent basis for Camelon Juniors, however, after one season he left the club, signing for amateur side Heriot Vale.

After one season with Heriot Vale, Sheerin moved to SJFA East Superleague club Musselburgh in July 2014, where he scored four goals in the sides opening two matches. He continued his impressive form throughout the season, scoring 42 goals in all competitions.

Senior football return
Sheernin's form with Musselburgh caught the attention of Scottish Championship side Livingston, who signed him on a two-year deal, making him one of the first summer signings. He went on to score three league goals in the 2015–16 season, but often found himself on the right-wing. On 2 June 2016, Sheerin signed for Scottish League Two side Berwick Rangers on a one-year deal, however, he left the club in February 2017, having scored seven goals in 26 appearances.

Junior return and Cowdenbeath
After leaving Berwick, Sheerin subsequently signed for SJFA East Superleague club Kelty Hearts on 8 February 2017. Sheerin was loaned out to Cowdenbeath the following season and signed on a permanent basis after a successful loan spell.

Craigroyston
In August 2019, Sheerin and Cowdenbeath agreed to cancel his contract so he could take up the manager reigns at Craigroyston. He left the club on 6 February 2020.

Gala Fairydean Rovers 
On 9 October 2020, Sheerin was appointed as assistant manager by Gala Fairydean Rovers for the 2020-21 Lowland League season.

References

External links

1989 births
Living people
East Fife F.C. players
Arniston Rangers F.C. players
Camelon Juniors F.C. players
Arbroath F.C. players
East Stirlingshire F.C. players
Musselburgh Athletic F.C. players
Livingston F.C. players
Berwick Rangers F.C. players
Kelty Hearts F.C. players
Cowdenbeath F.C. players
Footballers from Edinburgh
Scottish footballers
Association football forwards
Scottish Junior Football Association players
Scottish Football League players
Scottish Professional Football League players
Scottish football managers
Craigroyston F.C.